Specialisté (Specialists) is a Czech action crime series about a four-member team of police investigators focusing primarily on murders. The first season of the series premiered on TV Nova on January 16, 2017. The series has maintained a high viewership since the beginning of the broadcast and continues in the fall of 2022.

Cast and characters 
David Prachař as mjr. Mgr. Pavel Vondráček
Marek Adamczyk as 
Zuzana Kajnarová as kpt. Mgr. Zuzana Koutná
Martin Dejdar as mjr. Mgr. Josef Strouhal
Jiří Hána as kpt. Mgr. Martin Kovář
Eva Leimbergerová as kpt. JUDr. Mgr. Jana Šafářová
Jacob Erftemeijer as kpt. Mgr. Tomáš Beran
Jakub Štáfek as kpt. Bc. Lukáš Panenka
Jan Zadražil as kpt. Mgr. Jaroslav Čermák
Eliška Křenková as prap. Monika Švarcová

References

External links 
 Official page
 

Czech action television series
Czech crime television series
TV Nova (Czech TV channel) original programming
2017 Czech television series debuts